Crystal Geyser is located on the east bank of the Green River approximately  downstream from Green River, Utah, United States. It is a rare example of a cold-water carbon dioxide driven geyser; geothermal activity does not play a role in the activity of the geyser.  The ground water near the geyser has significant quantities of dissolved carbon dioxide, along with substantial underground gas accumulations in the surrounding area. Saturation of the aquifer with  creates enough pressure to force groundwater through the geyser and out on to the surface.

During 2005, a study of the timing of the eruptions found them to be bimodal. About 66% of eruptions in the study occurred about 8 hours after the previous eruption, and the rest about 22 hours after. The geyser erupts for an average of one hundred minutes a day, with eruptions either lasting 7–32 minutes, or 98–113 minutes. The bimodal distribution of eruptions is not a well-understood pattern, but is found in other geysers, both cold-water and otherwise.

Between eruption events, the water level is approximately seventeen feet below the surface of the geyser—at the level of the water table. In the preface to an eruption, water surfaces, fills the pond around the geyser, and begins to bubble. Bubbling events occur with increasing frequency in the time leading up to an eruption, but are not constant; bubbling events last for a few minutes, with a few minutes of calm in between. Bubbling events at the main geyser also frequently alternate with bubbling events at natural side-pools.

The current form of the geyser was created by an exploration well drilled in 1935 in attempt to locate oil.

The area surrounding the modern geyser is covered in a thick layer of orange travertine.  Near the river, adjacent to the modern orange travertine, are substantial deposits of white travertine, perhaps reflecting the original depositional environment of the geyser (before the exploratory well was drilled.)

Currently the geyser erupts every 8-27 hours, with some eruptions lasting 14 hours or longer. The average height of modern eruptions are less than ten feet in height. Speculation is that a geological event changed the geyser's underground structure. Some believe people filled the geyser with rocks in an effort to provoke eruptions.

The first written record of Crystal Geyser comes from the report of the Powell Geographic Expedition of 1869, July 13, 1869:

We stop to examine some interesting rocks, deposited by mineral springs that at one time must have existed here, but which are no longer flowing...GeologyThe area surrounding the modern geyser is covered in a thick layer of orange travertine.  The travertine is composed of couplets of highly porous, micritic laminae alternating with iron oxide-rich laminae. Aragonite is present near the vent and is replaced by magnesium-poor calcite farther away. The bacterium Leptothrix is probably responsible for the Frutexites‐like iron-rich laminae. Pisoids ("pearls") form in pools near the vent. 

Source of the water is the nearby Green River, which flows along the Little Grand Wash Fault and dissolves the calcium carbonate from the underlying Middle Jurassic strata, particularly the Summerville Formation. The average geyser water temperature is 18°C (64.4 F).

See also
 List of geysers
 Soda Springs, Idaho
 Travertine
 Wirthbacteria

References

External links

 Cold Water Geysers (Crystal Geyser, Utah)
 Implications of results from  flux surveys over known  systems for long-term monitoring

Bodies of water of Grand County, Utah
Geysers of Utah
Cold water geysers
Tourist attractions in Grand County, Utah